Lars Magnus Carlsson (born 24 June 1974) is a Swedish singer and former member of the bands Alcazar and Barbados as well as a solo performer.

Early life 
Magnus Carlsson was born in Borås and grew up in Fristad. He attended comprehensive upper secondary school for two years with a focus on musical training, and four further years at the Faculty of Arts in Gothenburg University, where he studied to be a music and song/voice teacher.

In 1992, Carlsson joined Swedish dansband Barbados. He left in 2002 and on 13 December 2002 he officially joined the pop-dance group Alcazar. On 24 January 2003, he performed his last concert with Barbados.

Solo career 
In February 2006, he was a contestant in Melodifestivalen's semi-final in Karlstad with "Lev Livet!", composed by Anders Glenmark and Niklas Strömstedt, and qualified for the final in Globen.

In 2007, Magnus performed in the third heat of Melodifestivalen 2007 in Örnsköldsvik with "Live Forever", an eighties-inspired electropop dance song. The entry came in 5th place and was knocked out of the contest but still became the 6th most frequently played song on Swedish radio in 2007. The song was released as a single on 5 March 2007 and reached the status of gold certificate.

Carlsson participated in Melodifestivalen 2015 with "Möt mig i Gamla stan" and made it to the final in Friends Arena, finishing 9th overall in 12 finalists.

Personal life
Carlsson married Mats Carlsson on 29 January 2006.

Discography

Studio albums

Compilation albums

Singles

See also
 Barbados
 Alcazar

References

External links 

1974 births
Alcazar (band) members
Swedish LGBT singers
Swedish gay musicians
Living people
People from Borås Municipality
Swedish male singers
Swedish-language singers
Dansband singers
Swedish pop singers
University of Gothenburg alumni
Nu-disco musicians
Gay singers
English-language singers from Sweden
20th-century Swedish LGBT people
21st-century Swedish LGBT people
Melodifestivalen contestants of 2015
Melodifestivalen contestants of 2007
Melodifestivalen contestants of 2006
Melodifestivalen contestants of 2005
Melodifestivalen contestants of 2003
Melodifestivalen contestants of 2002
Melodifestivalen contestants of 2001
Melodifestivalen contestants of 2000